The Hub may refer to:

Places
 The Hub, Bronx, an area of the South Bronx, New York, known for its convergence of subway and bus lines
 The Hub (Edinburgh), former church in Edinburgh that is now home to the Edinburgh International Festival
 The Hub (Gainesville, Florida), historic building on University of Florida campus
 The Hub, Jersey City a neighborhood in Jersey City, New Jersey
 The Hub (New Brunswick, New Jersey), medical and educational research building
 The Hub, Newcastle, a development in Newcastle Haymarket in England
 The Hub (Verwood), an entertainment venue in Verwood, Dorset, England
 The Hub, the original name of the Henry C. Lytton & Co. department store
 Boston, Massachusetts, by nickname
 The Hub (building), a residential skyscraper in Brooklyn, New York
 Husky Union Building, University of Washington, informally called "the Hub"

Fiction
 "The Hub" (MARVEL Agents of S.H.I.E.L.D.), an episode from the science-fiction series Marvel Agents of S.H.I.E.L.D.
 "The Hub" (Battlestar Galactica), an episode from the science-fiction series Battlestar Galactica
 The Hub (Discworld), the centre of the Discworld in the Discworld series by Terry Pratchett
 The Hub (Fallout), land area in Fallout (video game)
 The Hub, headquarters of Torchwood Institute in the Torchwood television series
 The Hub, name of the fictional cafe from That '70s Show
 The Hub, setting for several short stories and novels by science fiction writer James H. Schmitz
 The Hub, a “enigmatic” level of The Backrooms which is a car tunnel which has doors that lead to multiple levels, just like Warp Zones from the Super Mario series.

Media
 The Hub, the former name for Discovery Family, an American cable television channel
 The Hub (band), a computer network music ensemble
 The Hub (magazine), a publication covering lifestyle topics
 The Hub (TV programme), a British news program
 A minced oath for Pornhub

Other uses
 The Hub (forum), a darknet market discussion forum

See also
 Hub (disambiguation)